Miami is a beach near Mikra Sports Center in Nea Krini, Kalamaria, Thessaloniki, Greece is often called Miami, because there is a luxurious restaurant called Miami in the area.

Beaches of Greece
Landforms of Thessaloniki (regional unit)
Landforms of Central Macedonia